Newton Sterling (born 12 November 1984, in Morant Bay) is a Jamaican footballer who currently plays for Antigua Barracuda FC in the USL Professional Division.

Club career
Sterling began his career in the Jamaica National Premier League, playing for Harbour View, Real Mona and Constant Spring, before moving to Israel in 2005 to play for Hapoel Jerusalem. He played just two games for the club before moving to Norway to play for Sogndal on a short-term contract.

Sterling returned to Jamaica in late 2006 to play for Village United. After
taking part in a two-month trial at Swedish team GIF Sundsvall, and training with Charleston Battery in the spring of 2007, he joined Portmore United, and spent the next four seasons with the club. He was part of the Portmore team that won the Jamaica National Premier League title in 2008. He also spent time on loan with Waterhouse in 2008 and Arnett Gardens in 2009.

In 2011 Sterling transferred to the new Antigua Barracuda FC team prior to its first season in the USL Professional Division. He made his debut for the Barracudas on 21 April 2011, in a 1–0 loss to Sevilla FC Puerto Rico.

International career
Sterling made his debut for Jamaica in 2005 against Cuba, but has played only one other international since then, against the USA in April 2006.

References

External links
 
 Interview with Newton Sterling - Reggaeboyzsc

1984 births
Living people
Jamaican footballers
Jamaica international footballers
Jamaican expatriate footballers
Hapoel Jerusalem F.C. players
Expatriate footballers in Israel
Jamaican expatriate sportspeople in Israel
Expatriate footballers in Antigua and Barbuda
Jamaican expatriate sportspeople in Antigua and Barbuda
Waterhouse F.C. players
Harbour View F.C. players
Portmore United F.C. players
People from Saint Thomas Parish, Jamaica
Arnett Gardens F.C. players
Village United F.C. players
Antigua Barracuda F.C. players
USL Championship players
Liga Leumit players
Association football forwards
National Premier League players